(Old Norse:) is a god in Germanic mythology, a valorous and powerful member of the  and patron of warriors and mythological heroes. In Norse mythology, which provides most of the surviving narratives about gods among the Germanic peoples,  sacrifices his hand to the monstrous wolf , who bites it off when he realizes the gods have bound him.  is foretold of being consumed by the similarly monstrous dog  during the events of Ragnarök.

The  generally renders the god as Mars, the ancient Roman war god, and it is through that lens that most Latin references to the god occur.

Due to the etymology of the god's name and the shadowy presence of the god in the extant Germanic corpus, some scholars propose that  may have once held a more central place among the deities of early Germanic mythology.

Name

Various place names in Scandinavia refer to the god, and a variety of objects found in England and Scandinavia seem to depict  or invoke him.

Etymology 
The name of a Gothic deity named  (later ) may also be reconstructed based on the associated rune tyz. In Old Norse poetry, the plural  is used for 'the gods', and the singular , meaning '(a) god', occurs in kennings for Odin and Thor. Modern English writers frequently anglicize the god's name by dropping the proper noun's diacritic, rendering Old Norse's Týr as Tyr.

The Proto-Germanic masculine noun  means 'a god, a deity', and probably also served as a title or epithet that came to be associated with a specific deity whose original name is now lost. It stems from Proto-Indo-European , meaning 'celestial, heavenly one', hence a 'god' (cf. ,). The Romano-Germanic deity  may also be related, although its origin remains unclear.

Other scholars reject however his identification as a 'sky-god', since  was likely not his original name but rather an epithet that came to be associated with him and eventually replaced it.

Origin of Tuesday 
The modern English weekday name Tuesday comes from the Old English , meaning 'day of Tīw'. It is cognate with Old Norse , Old Frisian , and Old High German  (Middle High German ). All of them stem from Late Proto-Germanic  ('Day of '), a calque of Latin  ('Day of Mars'; cf. modern Italian , French , Spanish ).

These forms may refer to the god's association with the thing, a traditional legal assembly common among the ancient Germanic peoples with which the god is associated. This may be either explained by the existence of an epithet,  ( 'thing-god'), frequently attached to Mars, or simply by the god's strong association with the assembly.

T-rune 

The god is the namesake of the rune  representing  (the Tiwaz rune) in the runic alphabets, the indigenous alphabets of the ancient Germanic peoples prior to their adaptation of the Latin alphabet. On runic inscriptions,  often appears as a magical symbol.

Toponyms 
A variety of place names in Scandinavia refer to the god. For example, in Viby, Jutland, Denmark (Old Norse , ''s meadow') was once a stretch of meadow near a stream called  ('stream of the dead' or 'dead stream'). Viby also contained another theonym,  ("Odin's Holt"), and religious practices associated with Odin and  may have occurred in these places. A spring dedicated to Holy Niels that was likely a Christianization of prior indigenous pagan practice also exists in Viby.  may mean 'the settlement by the sacred site'. Archaeologists have found traces of sacrifices going back 2,500 years in Viby.

The forest , between Närke and Västergötland, in Sweden, may mean 'Tyr's forest', but its etymology is uncertain, and debated.  may refer to  meaning 'god' generally, and so the name may derive from Proto-Indo-European , meaning 'the forest of the gods'.

Attestations

Roman era
While 's etymological heritage reaches back to the Proto-Indo-European period, very few direct references to the god survive prior to the Old Norse period.

The first example of this occurs on record in Roman senator Tacitus's ethnography :
Among the gods Mercury is the one they principally worship. They regard it as a religious duty to sacrifice to him, on fixed days, human as well as other sacrificial victims. Hercules and Mars they appease by animal offerings of the permitted kind. Part of the Suebi sacrifice to Isis as well.
A.R. Birley translation
The identity of the "Isis" of the Suebi remains a topics of debate among scholars. Some scholars propose that this deity is in fact .

A votive altar has been discovered during excavations at Housesteads Roman Fort at Hadrian's Wall in England that had been erected at the behest of Frisian legionaries. The altar dates from the 3rd century CE and bears the Latin inscription . In this instance, the epithet  is a Latin rendering of Proto-Germanic theonym .

In the sixth century, the Roman historian Jordanes writes in his  that the Goths, an east Germanic people, saw the same "Mars" as an ancestral figure:

Moreover so highly were the Getae praised that Mars, whom the fables of poets call the god of war, was reputed to have been born among them. Hence Vergil says:
"Father Gradivus rules the Getic fields."
Now Mars has always been worshipped by the Goths with cruel rites, and captives were slain as his victims. They thought that he who was lord of war ought to be appeased by the shedding of human blood. To him they devoted the first share of the spoil, and in his honor arms stripped from the foe were suspended from trees. And they had more than all races a deep spirit of religion, since the worship of this god seemed to be really bestowed upon their ancestor.
C.C. Mierow translation

Old English 
The genitive  also appears in the name for Tuesday, .

Viking Age and post-Viking Age
By the Viking Age,  had developed among the North Germanic peoples into . The god receives numerous mentions in North Germanic sources during this period, but far less than other deities, such as Odin, Freyja, or Thor. The majority of these mentions occur in the Poetic Edda, compiled in the 13th century from traditional source material reaching into the pagan period, and the Prose Edda, composed by Icelandic skald and politician Snorri Sturluson in the 13th century.

Poetic Edda

Although  receives several mentions in the Poetic Edda, of the three poems in which he is mentioned—, and —only the incomplete poem, features him in a prominent role. In ,  says that his father, owns a tremendous cauldron with which he and his fellow gods can brew fathoms of ale.

Upon his return from hunting, 's wife (unnamed) tells  that his son has come to visit, that  has brought with him Thor, and that the two are behind a pillar. With just one glance,  immediately smashes the pillar and eight nearby kettles. The kettle containing  and Thor, particularly strong in its construction, does not break, and out of it the two gods stride.

 sees Thor and his heart jumps. The  orders three headless oxen boiled for his guests, and Thor eats two of the beasts.  tells the two that the following night, "we'll have to hunt for us three to eat".

In , the valkyrie  imparts in the hero Sigurd knowledge of various runic charms. One charm invokes the god :
'You must know victory-runes
if you want to know victory. Carve them
into your sword's hilt, on the blade guards
and the blades, invoking Tyr's name twice.'
Jeramy Dodds translation

In , the gods hold a feast. Loki bursts in and engages in flyting, a contest of insults, with the gods. The prose introduction to the poem mentions that "Tyr was in attendance, even though he had only one hand because the wolf Fenrir had recently ripped off the other while the wolf was being bound." Loki exchanges insults with each of the gods. After Loki insults the god ,  comes to 's defense. Loki says that "you can't be the right hand of justice among the people" because his right hand was torn off by Fenrir, elsewhere described as Loki's child.  says that although he misses his hand, Loki misses , who is now bound and will remain so until the events of Ragnarök.

Prose Edda

The Prose Edda sections  and  reference  several times. The god is introduced in part 25 of the  section of the book:
High said: 'There is also an As called Tyr. He is the bravest and most valiant, and he has great power over victory in battles. It is good for men of action to pray to him. There is a saying that a man is ty-valiant who surpasses other men and does not hesitate. He was so clever that a man who is clever is said to be ty-wise. And when the  refused to let him go then he bit off the hand at the place that is now called the wolf-joint [wrist], and he is one-handed and he is not considered a promoter of settlements between people.
A. Faulkes translations (notes are by Faulkes)

This is the most evil creature. He will have a battle with Tyr and they will each be the death of each other.
A. Faulkes translation

 opens with a narrative wherein twelve gods sit upon thrones at a banquet, including . By way of kennings,  explains, one might refer to the god Odin as "Victory-Tyr", "Hanged-Tyr", or "Cargo-Tyr"; and Thor may be referred to as "Chariot-Tyr".

In addition to the above mentions, 's name occurs as a kenning element throughout  in reference to the god Odin.

Archaeological record

Scholars propose that a variety of objects from the archaeological record depict .
In a similar fashion, a silver button was found in Hornsherred, Denmark, during 2019 that is interpreted to portray Týr fighting against the wolf .

Scholarly reception
Due in part to the etymology of the god's name, scholars propose that  once held a far more significant role in Germanic mythology than the scant references to the deity indicate in the Old Norse record. For example, according to scholar Hermann Reichert, due to the etymology of the god's name and its transparent meaning of "the god", "Odin ... must have dislodged  from his pre-eminent position. The fact that Tacitus names two divinities to whom the enemy's army was consecrated ... may signify their co-existence around 1 A.D."

The  passage above has resulted in some discourse among runologists. For example, regarding the passage, runologists Mindy MacLeod and Bernard Mees say:
Similar descriptions of runes written on swords for magical purposes are known from other Old Norse and Old English literary sources, though not in what seem to be religious contexts. In fact very few swords from the middle ages are engraved with runes, and those that are tend to carry rather prosaic maker's formulas rather than identifiable 'runes of victory'. The call to invoke Tyr here is often thought to have something to do with T-runes, rather than Tyr himself, given that this rune shares his name. In view of Tyr's martial role in Norse myth, however, this line seems simply to be a straightforward religious invocation with 'twice' alliterating with 'Tyr'.

In popular culture
The 15th studio album by the English heavy metal band Black Sabbath, Tyr, released in 1990, is named after .

 is featured in several video games.

  (spelled Tyr in the English version of the game) is one of nine minor gods Norse players can worship in Ensemble Studios' 2002 game Age of Mythology 
  (spelled Tyr in game) is also one of the playable gods in the third-person multiplayer online battle arena game Smite. Týr is mentioned several times in Santa Monica Studio's 2018 game God of War and appears in its sequel God of War Ragnarök, which was released in 2022. 
 Týr (spelled Tyr in game) is one of the available healer mechs in Pixonic's War Robots (released as "Walking War Robots" in 2014).

Notes

References

Sources

External links

  — Clicking on the thumbnail will give you the full image and information concerning it.

Æsir
Germanic gods
Justice gods
Killed deities
Norse gods
War gods
Mars (mythology)